Joseph Henry Delaney (25 July 1945 – 16 August 2022) was an English author, known for his dark fantasy series Spook's. He started his career as a teacher and wrote science fiction and fantasy novels for adults under the pseudonym J. K. Haderack. Delaney later wrote under his real name, starting with the publication of The Spook's Apprentice, in 2004, the first book in his Spook's series, which lead to international success. He published 19 books as part of the series, as well as several books which take place in the same universe. In 2014, The Spook's Apprentice, was adapted into a play script and the 2014 feature film Seventh Son. Delaney also published two other series: the science fiction Arena 13 and dark fantasy Aberrations.

Life and career
Joseph Henry Delaney was born on 25 July 1945 in Preston, Lancashire, the son of a labourer; he was the oldest of four children. Delaney attended Preston Catholic College and then worked as an apprentice engineer and fitter. He took his A-Levels at night school before studying  English, history and sociology as a mature student at Lancaster University. Following graduation, he studied at St Martin's College to become a teacher. He later became an English teacher at the Blackpool Sixth Form College, where he helped start the Media and Film Studies Department. In the 1980s Delaney completed an Open University degree in an effort to become a computer programmer. In 1983, he moved to the village of Stalmine, where he discovered that, in the past, a boggart had been found there by a priest; he noted this down and the finding later became the source of the Spook's series.

Delaney's first works were written under the pseudonym J. K. Haderack; a reference to the Kwisatz Haderach from Frank Herbert's Dune universe. After struggling to find success publishing fantasy and science fiction books for adults, his agent encouraged him to try writing for a younger audience, to meet the brief of a children's publisher. To fulfil the requirements of the brief, Delaney created a book based on a story he had first written in 1993, which was inspired by Stalmine's boggart, as well as Lancashire folklore and other stories. In 2004, he published the book as The Spook's Apprentice, under his real name, which became the first book in the dark fantasy Spook's series. Delaney achieved international success chronicling the adventures of his lead character, Tom Ward. The series has been published in 30 countries, with sales exceeding 4.5 million copies. Following the publication of the second book in the series, Delaney retired from teaching to write full-time. He identified J. R. R. Tolkien and Frank Herbert as his two biggest inspirations, Delaney, similar to Bram Stoker, author of Dracula, used his dreams to help write his stories.

From 2015 to 2017, Delaney published the science fiction Arena 13 trilogy. He published the dark fantasy Aberrations series from 2018 to 2019.

Delaney, who was living in Manchester, died on 16 August 2022, after a period of illness; he was 77 years old.

Personal life 
Delaney married Marie Smith in 1968; they had three children and nine grandchildren. She died of cancer in 2007. In 2014, he married Athi Ranee Kuncher Vannithamby.  

Delaney shared his name (including middle name) with the late Joseph H. Delaney, an American science fiction author of several books and short stories.

Works

Spook's 

Spook's (published in America as The Last Apprentice) follows Tom Ward, the seventh son of a seventh son, on his adventures as apprentice to John Gregory, the local "Spook" or master fighter of supernatural evil. John is the Spook for "the County" and gives Tom practical instruction on tackling ghosts, ghasts, witches, boggarts, and all manner of other things that serve "The Dark". Tom soon discovers that most of his predecessors have failed for various reasons—including death. As the Chronicles progress the focus expands to other characters such as the assassin Grimalkin and the young witch Alice Deane.

The Wardstone Chronicles 
Overall the first series' arc, titled The Wardstone Chronicles, develops the plot line of Tom being destined to either save the world or destroy it. "The County" referred to in the Chronicles is based on Lancashire in the north west of England. Several of the locations mentioned in the books are thinly-veiled versions of actual places; Priestown is the author's hometown of Preston, Caster is Lancaster, Black Pool is Blackpool, and Chipenden is Chipping.

 The Spook's Apprentice (America: The Last Apprentice: Revenge of the Witch) – 2004
 The Spook's Curse (America: The Last Apprentice: Curse of the Bane) – 2005
 The Spook's Secret (America: The Last Apprentice: Night of the Soul Stealer) – 2006
 The Spook's Battle (America: The Last Apprentice: Attack of the Fiend) – 2007
 The Spook's Mistake (America: The Last Apprentice: Wrath of the Bloodeye) – 2008
 The Spook's Sacrifice (America: The Last Apprentice: Clash of the Demons) – 2009
 The Spook's Nightmare (America: The Last Apprentice: Rise of the Huntress) – 2010
 The Spook's Destiny (America: The Last Apprentice: Rage of the Fallen) – 2011
 Spook's: I Am Grimalkin (America: The Last Apprentice: Grimalkin the Witch Assassin) – 2011
 The Spook's Blood (America: The Last Apprentice: Lure of the Dead ) – 2012
 Spook's: Slither's Tale (America: The Last Apprentice: Slither) – 2013
 Spook's: Alice (America: The Last Apprentice: I Am Alice) – 2013
 The Spook's Revenge (America: The Last Apprentice: Fury of the Seventh Son) – 2014

The Starblade Chronicles 
The Starblade Chronicles are a trilogy following the continued adventures of Tom Ward, who has finished his apprenticeship and is now a Spook in his own right dedicated to fighting an unparalleled evil threatening the County, and the world. However, unlike past Spooks, Tom is only seventeen, and he is met with doubt and distrust by many in the County owing to his age. Complicating matters is his interactions with Jenny; the sixteen-year-old girl who seeks to be his apprentice, notwithstanding that women have never been Spooks before.

 Spook's: A New Darkness – 2014
 Spook's: The Dark Army – 2016
 Spook's: The Dark Assassin – 2017

The Spook's Apprentice: Brother Wulf 
The Spook's Apprentice: Brother Wulf follows the adventures of novice monk Brother Beowulf.

 Brother Wulf – 2020
 Brother Wulf: Wulf's Bane – 2021
 Brother Wulf: The Last Spook – 2022
 Brother Wulf: Wulf's War – 2023

Spook's spin-offs 

Delaney has also written spin-off works set in the world of Spook's.

The Spook's Tale – This short story was combined with Mark Walden's Interception Point as part of a small (128 pages) special publication for World Book Day UK 2009 which could be purchased at that event for a £1 coupon. – 2009
The Last Apprentice: The Spook's Tale And Other Horrors – A collection of four short stories [The Spook's Tale; Alice's Tale; Grimalkin's Tale; A Gallery of Villains]; this is a USA-released compilation incorporating the earlier published The Spook's Tale. – 2009
The Spook's Stories: Witches – A collection of five short stories [Meg Skelton; Dirty Dora; Alice And The Brain Guzzler; The Banshee Witch; Grimalkin's Tale]. Published in the US as The Last Apprentice – A Coven of Witches. – 2009
The Spook's Bestiary – A guidebook to the creatures found in The Wardstone Chronicles universe. Published in the US as The Last Apprentice – The Spook's Bestiary: The Guide to Creatures of the Dark. – 2010
The Ghost Prison (The book occupies the same world as The Wardstone Chronicles, but with different characters and story lines) – 2013
The Last Apprentice: The Seventh Apprentice (Novella featuring the Spook's seventh apprentice, a boy named Will Johnson) – 2015

Arena 13 
Arena 13 follows the adventures of sixteen-year-old Leif, who seeks to become the champion of the notorious Arena 13 fighting pit and destroy Hob, the evil creature who rules and terrorises the city zone of Midgard and who destroyed Leif's family.

Arena 13 – 2015
Arena 13: The Prey – 2016
Arena 13: The Warrior – 2017

Aberrations 
Aberrations follows the story of Crafty, who has been stuck in his family's cellar for nearly a year. His only companions are his restless, whispering dead brothers, and an unusually friendly aberration he names the Bog Queen.

The Beast Awakens – 2018
The Witch's Warning – 2019

Other works
Mysterious Erotic Tales (writing as J. K. Haderack; contributing author of "Elvara Should Be Easy" to this short story anthology) – 1996
Mercer's Whore (writing as J. K. Haderack) – 1997
Half-Minute Horrors (contributing author of "All Fingers and Thumbs" to this short story anthology) – 2009
Haunted (contributing author of "The Castle Ghosts" to this short story anthology) – 2011

Adaptations 
In 2014, Stephen Delaney, Joseph Delaney's son, adapted The Spook's Apprentice into a 160-page play script; it is published under the title The Spook's Apprentice – Play Edition.

A 2014 film adaptation of The Spook's Apprentice was produced by Legendary Pictures, directed by Sergey Bodrov, and entitled Seventh Son. Ben Barnes played Tom Ward, Jeff Bridges was the Spook, Julianne Moore was Mother Malkin, Alicia Vikander was Alice Deane, Kit Harington was Billy Bradley, Djimon Hounsou was Radu (an original character), and Antje Traue was Bony Lizzie.

References

External links
 
 Penguin Books Author Page
 Fantastic Fiction Author Page
 Author interview with Fantasy Book Review
 

1945 births
2022 deaths
20th-century English male writers
20th-century pseudonymous writers
21st-century English male writers
21st-century pseudonymous writers
Alumni of Lancaster University
Alumni of Lonsdale College, Lancaster
Alumni of the Open University
Dark fantasy writers
English children's writers
English fantasy writers
English science fiction writers
Schoolteachers from Lancashire
Writers from Preston, Lancashire